The governor of New France was the viceroy of the King of France in North America. A French nobleman, he was appointed to govern the colonies of New France, which included Canada, Acadia and Louisiana. The residence of the Governor was at the Chateau St. Louis in the capital of Quebec City. Acadia, Louisiana, and the towns of Trois-Rivières and Montreal had their own particular governors.

Prior to the establishment of the 1663 Sovereign Council, the highest positions in New France were that of Governor and Lieutenant-General, which were often held by the same person. The Governor then had responsibilities over both military and civil affairs in the colonies.

With the new royal administration of 1663, the title of governor general was given to the person responsible for the military and diplomatic relations. The duties of administration of justice, police and finance were given to the Intendant, who presided over the Sovereign Council. The Governor General answered to the French Secretary of State of the Navy and the Controller General of Finance.

Beginning with Charles de Montmagny, First Nations referred to the Governor as Onontio, meaning 'Great Mountain'. Each Onontio was the head of the Franco-Indian alliance.

List of governors

See also 

 List of governors general of Canada#Governors of New France, 1627–1663
 Governor General of New France
 Governor of Montreal
 Governor of Acadia
 Governor of Plaisance
 Governor of Louisiana
 List of seignories of Quebec

External links
 New France - Administration

 02
New France
New France
New France
1627 establishments in New France
1663 disestablishments in New France